Chiasmatic may refer to:

 Chiasmatic cistern
 Chiasmatic groove